The John Day Compound, Supervisor's Warehouse is a complex of work buildings, employee residences, and related infrastructure owned an operated by the Malheur National Forest in John Day, Oregon, United States. Built by the Civilian Conservation Corps in 1936–1946, it is the headquarters for field operations in the national forest and is typical of projects carried out by the CCC on behalf of the Forest Service. It represents that era's shift in the Forest Service's architectural vision toward comprehensive site planning, as well as its policy evolution from custodial superintendence of the national forests toward active natural resource management.

The complex was added to the National Register of Historic Places in 1986.

See also
National Register of Historic Places listings in Grant County, Oregon

References

External links

National Register of Historic Places in Grant County, Oregon
Buildings and structures in Grant County, Oregon
Park buildings and structures on the National Register of Historic Places in Oregon
Government buildings completed in 1937
Malheur National Forest
United States Forest Service architecture
Civilian Conservation Corps in Oregon
Rustic architecture in Oregon
John Day, Oregon
1946 establishments in Oregon